The 2008 BBL Champions Cup was the fourth edition of the super cup game in German basketball.

Match

References

BBL Champions Cup
Champions Cup